Wetherill is an English language surname, and may refer to:

Charles M. Wetherill, American chemist
David Wetherill, British table tennis player
George Wetherill, American physicist
Louisa Wade Wetherill (1877–1945), American explorer and trader
Richard Wetherill, American archaeologist
Roderick Wetherill, American Army general

See also
2128 Wetherill
Fort Wetherill
Wetherill Park, New South Wales
Wetherell
Weatherall
Wetherall